The W38 was an American thermonuclear warhead used in the early to mid-1960s as a warhead for Atlas E and F, and LGM-25 Titan I ICBMs. It was first built in 1961 and was in service from 1961 to 1965.  70 were deployed on Titan I missiles and 110 on Atlas missiles.  It used the Avco Mark 4 reentry vehicle.

The W38 was 32 inches (81 cm) in diameter and 82.5 inches (2 m) long.

The W38 was the first thermonuclear ICBM warhead developed by the UCRL (University of California Radiation Laboratory), which is now known as the Lawrence Livermore National Laboratory.

The W38 was superseded by the Titan II missile family with a W53 warhead and 9 megaton payload.

See also 
 List of nuclear weapons

References

External links 
 List of all US nuclear weapons

Nuclear warheads of the United States
Military equipment introduced in the 1960s